Amy Andrea Childs (born 7 June 1990) is an English television personality and model. She appeared in the first two series of the ITV2 reality series The Only Way Is Essex, and subsequently starred in her own reality series It's All About Amy from 2011 to 2012. Childs came in fourth place in the Channel 5 series Celebrity Big Brother 8 in 2011, and in 2014, she participated in the Channel 4 series The Jump. Childs returned to The Only Way Is Essex in 2020.

Early life
Childs was born on 7 June 1990 in Barking, London, but relocated to Brentwood, Essex. She attended Raphael Independent School, where she was head girl. She left the school with four GCSE qualifications.

Career 
Childs rose to fame in 2010 after appearing in the ITV2 reality series The Only Way Is Essex. She later signed to Can Associates management agency. As a model, she has posed for the fashion magazine Vogue. Childs put her name to a ghost-written column for New! magazine, and presented a regular fashion segment on the ITV series This Morning. In July 2011, she was named Personality of the Year at the National Reality TV Awards.

From December 2011 to January 2012, Childs appeared in her own reality series, titled It's All About Amy, broadcast on Channel 5. The series was cancelled after one series due to low ratings. In February 2012, Childs competed in an episode of Let's Dance for Sport Relief alongside cousin Harry Derbidge. She later participated in a celebrity special of The Bank Job on Channel 4 in March 2012. In 2020, Childs was a main cast member on the eighth series of the E4 reality programme Celebs Go Dating. Later that year, it was announced that she would be returning to The Only Way Is Essex after nine years, making her return in the twenty-sixth series, alongside cousin Harry Derbridge.

Personal life
Childs was in a relationship with builder Bradley Wright from 2013 to 2017. She gave birth to their daughter in 2017. They separated shortly after their daughter’s birth. Childs gave birth to her second child in 2018.

Filmography

See also
 Vajazzle

References

External links

 

1990 births
Living people
English businesspeople
English columnists
English women in business
English women non-fiction writers
People from Barking, London
People from Brentwood, Essex
Television personalities from London
British women columnists